Qalehlar (also Romanized as Qal‘ehlar; also known as Ghal’eh Lar and Kalalar) is a village in Mavazekhan-e Sharqi Rural District, Khvajeh District, Heris County, East Azerbaijan Province, Iran. At the 2006 census, its population was 158, in 40 families.

References 

Populated places in Heris County